Artem Ihorovych Zasyadvovk (born 20 May 1983) is a former Ukrainian professional footballer.

Club career
He made his professional debut in the Ukrainian Second League in 1999 for FC Dynamo-3 Kyiv. He played 4 games in the UEFA Intertoto Cup 2004 for FC Shinnik Yaroslavl.

References

1983 births
Footballers from Kyiv
Living people
Ukrainian footballers
Association football midfielders
FC Dynamo-3 Kyiv players
FC Shinnik Yaroslavl players
Russian Premier League players
Ukrainian expatriate footballers
Expatriate footballers in Russia
Ukrainian expatriate sportspeople in Russia